James Davis (born 1706 or 1707 – 13 July 1755) was a  Welsh physician and satirist.

Life
Davis was born in Chepstow, Monmouthshire, Wales, and, on 18 February 1723 at the age of sixteen, he matriculated at Jesus College, Oxford.  He obtained his Bachelor of Arts degree on 13 October 1726, advancing to Master of Arts on 9 July 1729. He then studied medicine, obtaining a Bachelor of Medicine degree on 7 December 1732.  He then worked as a physician in Devizes, Wiltshire until his death there on 13 July 1755.

His work Origines Divisianae, or, The antiquities of the Devizes in some familiar letters to a friend wrote in the years 1750 and 1751 was published in 1754. It caricatured the antiquarian studies of William Stukeley (who pioneered the archeological investigation of Stonehenge) and his contemporaries, presenting various fancies as facts of local history.  Some of these tricks deceived later writers.

Davis showed his sense of humour with turns of phrase such as:

and finished his book by writing:

References

1700s births
1755 deaths
Alumni of Jesus College, Oxford
People from Chepstow
18th-century Welsh medical doctors
Welsh satirists
Welsh non-fiction writers
Anglo-Welsh writers